Conus malcolmi is a species of sea snail, a marine gastropod mollusc in the family Conidae, the cone snails, cone shells or cones.

These snails are predatory and venomous. They are capable of "stinging" humans.

Description
The size of the shell varies between 11 mm and 30 mm.

Distribution
This marine species occurs in the Red Sea.

References

 Révision of the Kioconus caillaudi complex. Description of two new endemic Kioconus (Gastropoda, Conidae): K. hoaraui n.sp, from La Réunion and K. malcolmi n.sp, from the Red Sea by E. Monnier & L. Limpalaër; Xenophora Taxonomy N° 7 - Supplément au Xenophora n° 150 - Avril 2015

External links
 To World Register of Marine Species

malcolmi
Gastropods described in 2015